Michał Jliński (born 17 March 1980, in Gorzów Wielkopolski) is a Polish rower. He won a gold medal in quadruple sculls at the 2008 Summer Olympics.

For his sporting achievements, he received the Knight's Cross of the Order of Polonia Restituta in 2008.

References 

1980 births
Living people
Sportspeople from Gorzów Wielkopolski
Polish male rowers
Olympic rowers of Poland
Rowers at the 2004 Summer Olympics
Rowers at the 2008 Summer Olympics
Rowers at the 2012 Summer Olympics
Olympic gold medalists for Poland
Knights of the Order of Polonia Restituta
Olympic medalists in rowing
Medalists at the 2008 Summer Olympics
World Rowing Championships medalists for Poland
European Rowing Championships medalists